Thomas Clayton Twitchell (1864–1947) was an English Anglican bishop in the 20th century. He was educated at King's College London and ordained in 1889. His first posts were curacies at St George's, Barrow-in-Furness and St Peter's, Cranley Gardens. From 1903 to 1908 he was Vicar of All Hallows East India Docks when he was appointed Bishop of Polynesia a post he held for 13 years. He was consecrated a bishop on Ascension Day 1908 (28 May), by Randall Davidson, Archbishop of Canterbury, at Southwark Cathedral. On his return to England he was Rector of St Margaret, Buxted and then of St Peter's Selsey. A Fellow of King's College, London he died on 9 October 1947.

References

1864 births
Alumni of King's College London
Fellows of King's College London
Anglican bishops of Polynesia
20th-century Anglican bishops in Oceania
1947 deaths
People from Buxted
People from Selsey